Mythri may refer to:

 Mythri (2012 film), a Telugu suspense film
 Mythri (2015 film), an Indian Kannada-language social drama film